Sofiivka is an urban-type settlement in Kryvyi Rih District in central Ukraine. It hosts the administration of Sofiivka settlement community, one of the hromadas of Ukraine. Population: 

Sofiivka is located on the banks of the Kamianka river, a right tributary of the Bazavluk in the basin of the Dnipro River.

Until 18 July 2020, Sofiivka was the administrative center of Sofiivka District. The raion was abolished in July 2020 as part of the administrative reform of Ukraine, which reduced the number of raions of Dnipropetrovsk Oblast to seven. The area of Sofiivka Raion was merged into Kryvyi Rih Raion.

Economy

Transportation
Sofiivka is on the H11 highway which connects Dnipro and Kryvyi Rih. It also have road access to Apostolove in the south and Piatykhatky in the north.

References

Urban-type settlements in Kryvyi Rih Raion
Yekaterinoslav Governorate